Mylochromis anaphyrmus is a species of cichlid endemic to Lake Malawi where it can be found at depths of around  in waters with sandy substrates.  This species can reach a length of  TL.  This species can also be found in the aquarium trade.

References

anaphrymus
Cichlid fish of Africa
Fish of Lake Malawi
Fish described in 1973
Taxonomy articles created by Polbot